Vancouver riot may refer to any of several riots in Vancouver, British Columbia, Canada, including:
Anti-Oriental riots (Vancouver), anti-immigration riots in 1907
Battle of Ballantyne Pier, a 1935 riot during a dockers' strike
Bloody Sunday (1938), the conclusion of a sitdown strike by unemployed men
Gastown riots, 1971 riots following a police attack on a peaceful smoke-in protest
1994 Vancouver Stanley Cup riot, following the Vancouver Canucks' loss to the New York Rangers
2011 Vancouver Stanley Cup riot, following the Boston Bruins' win over the Canucks